The 2014 ACC men's and women's lacrosse conferences will include six teams, up from four in 2013. Notre Dame and Syracuse joined the ACC in July 2013. This will be the only year that the ACC men's lacrosse conference will include these six teams as Maryland will leave the ACC for the Big Ten at the end of the 2014 season. The finalists from the 2013 NCAA championship game are in the ACC conference in 2014, Duke and Syracuse. Additionally, all six teams are included in the Top 10 of the Lacrosse Magazine preseason ranking. The 2014 ACC men's lacrosse conference includes teams that have won 23 national championships and have 45 appearances in the title game in the 42-year history of the NCAA Championship.

On May 4, 2014 the NCAA will announce the 18 teams that will play in the Division I men's lacrosse tournament. As part of this selection, the bottom four teams will play two play-in games. The ACC is one of 10 conferences that have automatic qualifiers, meaning the winner of the ACC tournament will appear in the tournament, leaving five ACC teams competing for eight at-large bids. Four of the six teams in the ACC will compete in the conference tournament on April 25, 2014. PPL Park in Philadelphia, Pa., will host the ACC tournament in both 2014 and 2015.

ACC men's lacrosse team class composition

ACC teams with most "top 50" recruits in last three years

*Inside Lacrosse

NCAA tournament performance (last six years)

 * Note: Syracuse was not a member of the ACC for lacrosse in 2008 & 2009, they were independent

2014 MLL draft - ACC players

Returning All-Americans in the ACC

Next games

Non conference:
Duke (8-2, #3, 2-1 ACC) vs. Harvard (5-3, #18), Sunday, 3/29/14, 12pm
North Carolina (7-2, #5, 1-2 ACC) vs. Johns Hopkins (5-2, #9), Saturday, 3/29/14, 2pm

Conference:
Maryland (7-1, #4, 2-1 ACC) vs. Virginia (7-2, #8, 1-1 ACC), Sunday, 3/30/14, 12pm
Notre Dame (4-2, #7, 2-0 ACC) vs. Syracuse (4-3, #10, 0-3 ACC), 3/29/14, 12pm

High School matrix

Regional matrix

Duke
In the 2013 season, Duke defeated Syracuse 16-10 to win the NCAA Division I Men's Lacrosse championship. 15 of the 25 players in the 2013 championships game will play again for Duke in 2014. Attackman Jordan Wolf and face-off man Brendan Fowler were named pre-season first team All-Americans. Joining them on the list on the second team is Henry Lobb, senior defenseman. Honorable mentions are Josh Dionne (attack), Myles Jones (midfield), Will Haus (midfield), Luke Duprey (long-stick midfield) and Chris Hipps (defense). Face-off specialist Brendan Fowler was a first team All-American in 2013. In the four games in the NCAA tournament that year, he won 70% of his face-offs and gathered 10 ground balls per game. For the entire season he won 64% of his face-offs.

Duke's coaching staff places a priority on ground ball statistics in their post-game reviews. In comparison, Johns Hopkins has found that the four most important post-game statistical considerations are shooting percentage, your opponent's shooting percentage, your save percentage and your opponent's save percentage.

Duke starters

Attackmen

Midfield

Long-Stick Midfield

Defense

Face Off

Goalkeeper

Maryland
In 2013, Maryland lost to Cornell in the first round of the NCAA Division I Men's Lacrosse Championship tournament.

Maryland starters

Attackmen

Midfield

Long-Stick Midfield

Defense

Face Off

Goalkeeper

Amato's statistics

North Carolina
North Carolina is the only men's lacrosse team in the ACC that has not been to either the final four or the championship game in the last three years. In fact, UNC has not been to the final four of the NCAA championship tournament since 1993. Last year UNC lost to Denver in the second round of the NCAA tournament. Before that, UNC won the ACC tournament for the first time since in 17 years.

The 2014 North Carolina Tar Heels men's lacrosse team will represent the University of North Carolina at Chapel Hill in the 2014 National Collegiate Athletic Association (NCAA) Division I men's lacrosse season. The head coach, UNC alumnus Joe Breschi, will coach UNC for his 6th year. Breschi was previously a first-team All-American defenseman in 1990 and a USA national team member in 1990 and 1994.

UNC will return seven out of ten players from its 2013 starting lineup. Four midfielders on the 2014 team were on the roster of the U19 USA team in 2012: Brent Armstrong (sophomore), Stephen Kelly (freshman), Steven Pontrello (sophomore) and Michael Tagliaferri (sophomore). UNC and UVA had the most players on the 2012 U19 team, both with four. Returning faceoff man R.G. Keenan was a first-team All-American in 2012. ACC coaches named attackman Joey Sankey to the 2013 All-ACC team. Senior defensive midfielder Mark McNeill also plays wide receiver on the UNC football team.

Senior midfielder Frankie Kelly and sophomore attackman Patrick Kelly are cousins. Their uncle, Bryan Kelly (UNC 1991), coached them in high school at Calvert Hall in Baltimore, Maryland. Frankie Kelly is freshman Stephen Kelly's older brother. 
Frankie (UNC 2014) and Stephen Kelly (UNC 2017) are brothers and sons of Frank Kelly, III, who played lacrosse at Cornell. Frank Kelly, III has two brothers that played lacrosse at UNC and both won championships at UNC: David Kelly (UNC 1989) and Bryan Kelly (UNC 1991). Both played on the UNC lacrosse team with current head coach Joe Breschi. Patrick Kelly (UNC 2015) is a cousin of Frankie and Stephen Kelly. His father David Kelly (UNC 1989) won a lacrosse championship in 1986. His uncle on his mother's side (Ken Miller) played football at UNC.

In other family relations, Junior attackman Jimmy Bitter's older brother Billy Bitter was a first-team All-American for UNC in 2009 and 2010. Sophomore midfielder Jake Matthai's dad played on the UNC lacrosse team from 1975-79. Sophomore goalkeeper Kieran Burke's two older brothers played lacrosse at UNC, Brian (2005–08), a defenseman, and Sean (2007–10), a midfielder.

UNC had the most recruits in the Inside Lacrosse top 50 rankings for the last two years. UNC had seven players on the Inside Lacrosse top 50 list in 2012 versus nine in 2011. In total, UNC had 16 players in the top 50 lists in the last two years. The next highest count was Duke University with 10.

Stephen Kelly signed a National Letter of Intent with Carolina in November 2012 and will enroll in UNC after he graduates high school in August 2013. Kelly was the only rising senior in high school that made the U19 U.S. Team in 2012 - the rest of the team had already graduated high school.

UNC recruits in Top 50

*Inside Lacrosse

UNC players on 2014 team on "Top 50" recruit list

*Inside Lacrosse

UNC depth chart

Attackmen

Midfield

Face-off

Long-stick midfielder rotation (last game)

Defense

Close defense statistics (starters) versus prior season

Goalkeeper

UNC goalkeeper statistics versus prior season

2014 Injuries and missed games

Notre Dame
In 2013, Notre Dame lost to Duke in the second round of the Division I Men's Lacrosse Championship tournament.

Notre Dame starters

Attackmen

Midfield

Long-Stick Midfield

Defense

Face Off

Goalkeeper

Syracuse
In 2013, Syracuse lost to Duke in the finals of the Division I Men's Lacrosse Championship tournament.

Syracuse starters

Attackmen

Midfield

Long-Stick Midfield

Defense

Face Off

Goalkeeper

Virginia
In 2013, Virginia did not make the Division I Men's Lacrosse Championship tournament for the first time since 2004.  UVA led Division I lacrosse teams in ground balls per game in 2013 with 39.93/game. That average is down in the first three games of 2014 at 36/game.

Virginia starters

Attackmen

Midfield

Long-Stick Midfielders

Defense

Face Off

Goalkeeper

Face-Off Matrix

References

Atlantic Coast Conference men's lacrosse